Frederick County is located in the Commonwealth of Virginia. As of the 2020 census, the population was 91,419. Its county seat is Winchester. The county was formed in 1743 by the splitting of Orange County. It is Virginia's northernmost county. Frederick County is included in the Winchester, VA-WV Metropolitan Statistical Area, which is also included in the Washington-Baltimore-Northern Virginia, DC-MD-VA-WV-PA Combined Statistical Area.

History 
The area that would become Frederick County, Virginia, was inhabited and transited by various indigenous peoples for thousands of years before European colonization.

Colonization efforts began with the Virginia Company of London, but European settlement did not flourish until after the company lost its charter and Virginia became a royal colony in 1624. In order to stimulate migration to the colony, the headright system was used. Under this system, those who funded an emigrant's transportation costs (not the actual colonizers) were compensated with land. In 1649 the exiled King Charles II granted several acres of colonial Virginia lands to "seven loyal supporters", including Lord Fairfax. The Fairfax lands passed to Thomas Fairfax, 5th Lord Fairfax of Cameron (1657-1710), who married the daughter of Thomas Colepeper, who also owned several acres of land. After their son, Lord Thomas Fairfax, inherited the combined grants, he controlled over 5,000,000 acres of land in Virginia, including much of the land that became Frederick County.

Frederick County was created from Orange County in 1738, and was officially organized in 1743. The Virginia Assembly named the new county for Frederick Louis, Prince of Wales (1707–1751), the eldest son of King George II of Great Britain. At that time, "Old Frederick County" encompassed all or part of four counties in present-day Virginia and five in present-day West Virginia:
 Hampshire (West Virginia), created 1754
 Dunmore, created 1772 and renamed Shenandoah in 1778
 Berkeley (West Virginia), created 1772
 Hardy (West Virginia), created 1786
 Jefferson (West Virginia), created 1801
 Morgan (West Virginia), created 1820
 Page, created 1831
 Clarke, created 1836
 Warren, created 1836

Colonial era 
As commanding officer of the new Colonial Virginia regiment in 1754, Colonel George Washington located his headquarters in Winchester before and during the French and Indian War. He resigned from military service in 1758. He represented Frederick County in his first elective office, having been elected to the House of Burgesses in 1758 and 1761. 

Seventeen years later, on June 15, 1775, the Continental Congress "elected" George Washington as commander-in-chief of the yet-to-be-created Continental Army. He accepted the appointment the next day. This preceded the Congress's declaration of independence and the outbreak of the American Revolutionary War.

War of 1812

American Civil War 
Winchester was a site of volatile conditions during the Civil War of 1861-1865, with control shifting between the Confederate and Union armies on average once every three weeks during the war. Many battles were fought in Frederick County. Some of those battles included:
 First Battle of Kernstown, March 1862
 First Battle of Winchester, May 1862
 Second Battle of Winchester, June 1863
 Second Battle of Kernstown, July 1864
 Third Battle of Winchester (Battle of Opequon), September 1864
 Battle of Cedar Creek, October 1864

The first constitution of West Virginia provided for Frederick County to be added to the new state if approved by a local election.
Unlike the residents of neighboring Berkeley and Jefferson counties, those in Frederick County voted to remain in Virginia, despite being occupied by the Confederate army at the time.

Civilian history of the area
Four (alkaline, saline, chalybeate, and sulphured) types of mineral water springs naturally occur on the land that would later be named Rock Enon Springs. The area was once called Capper Springs, named for area settler John Capper. It survived the American Civil War. On March 24, 1899, the Shenandoah Valley National Bank purchased the property for $3,500. During the summer of 1914 botanists found a variety of ferns on the property: polypodium vulgare, phegopteris hexagonoptera, adiantum pedatum, pteris aquilina, and cheilanthes lanosa on the property.

The idea that soaking in the natural spring water had medical value made this and other springs popular tourist destinations through the early 20th century.

In 1944, people no longer had as much faith in the springs, and there was much more competition for tourists at other sites. Due to declining business, the Glaize family sold the property to the Shenandoah Area Council. They adapted the resort to operate as a Boy Scout site, Camp Rock Enon. In 1944 the  Miller Lake was created by adding a  earth dam across Laurel Run using equipment, owned by the Federal fish hatchery in Leestown. In 1958 "walnut, chestnut and persimmon trees" were planted on the property.

Geography

This is the northernmost county in the Commonwealth of Virginia.

Adjacent counties

National protected areas
 Cedar Creek and Belle Grove National Historical Park (part)
 George Washington National Forest (part)

Demographics

2020 census

Note: the US Census treats Hispanic/Latino as an ethnic category. This table excludes Latinos from the racial categories and assigns them to a separate category. Hispanics/Latinos can be of any race.

2000 Census
As of the census of 2000, there were 59,209 people, 22,097 households, and 16,727 families residing in the county. There were 23,319 housing units at an average density of 56/square mile (22/km2). The racial makeup of the county was 94.99% White, 2.62% Black or African American, 0.16% Native American, 0.66% Asian, 0.02% Pacific Islander, 0.56% from other races, and 1.01% from two or more races.  1.70% of the population were Hispanic or Latino of any race.

There were 22,097 households, out of which 36.60% had children under the age of 18 living with them, 62.50% were married couples living together, 8.80% had a female householder with no husband present, and 24.30% were non-families. 19.20% of all households were made up of individuals, and 6.80% had someone living alone who was 65 years of age or older.  The average household size was 2.64 and the average family size was 3.02.

In the county, the population was spread out, with 26.40% under the age of 18, 7.00% from 18 to 24, 31.90% from 25 to 44, 24.10% from 45 to 64, and 10.60% who were 65 years of age or older.  The median age was 37 years. For every 100 females, there were 100.10 males.  For every 100 females age 18 and over, there were 96.70 males.

The median income for a household in the county was $46,941, and the median income for a family was $52,281. Males had a median income of $35,705 versus $25,046 for females. The per capita income for the county was $21,080.  About 4.00% of families and 6.40% of the population were below the poverty line, including 7.30% of those under age 18 and 6.90% of those age 65 or over.

Government

Board of Supervisors
 Chairman: Charles S. DeHaven, Jr. (R)
 Back Creek District: Shawn Graber (R)
 Gainesboro District: Douglas McCarthy (R)
 Opequon District: Robert Wells (R)
 Red Bud District: Blaine P. Dunn (R)
 Shawnee District: David Stegmaier (R)
 Stonewall District: Judith McCann-Slaughter (R)

Constitutional officers
 Clerk of the Circuit Court: Rebecca P. "Becky" Hogan (D)
 Commissioner of the Revenue: Seth T. Thatcher (R)
 Commonwealth's Attorney: Ross Spicer (R)
 Sheriff: Lenny Millholland (I)
 Treasurer: C. William Orndoff, Jr. (R)

Frederick is represented by Republican Jill Holtzman Vogel (R), in the Virginia Senate, Wendy Gooditis (D), Chris Collins (R), and Dave LaRock (R), in the Virginia House of Delegates, and Jennifer Wexton (D) in the U.S. House of Representatives.

Transportation

 Winchester Transit provides weekday transit for the city of Winchester.

Major highways

Education
Frederick County is served by Frederick County Public Schools, which includes several elementary, middle, and high schools. Frederick County is also part of the region served by the Mountain Vista Governor's School, which offers upper-level classes to intellectually gifted high school students.

Schools

Elementary schools

Middle schools
 Admiral Richard E. Byrd Middle School
 Frederick County Middle School
 Robert E. Aylor Middle School

High schools
 James Wood High School
 Millbrook High School
 Sherando High School

Colleges
 Laurel Ridge Community College

Universities
 Shenandoah University

Libraries 
 Handley Regional Library

Communities

Although designated as the county seat, Winchester, like all cities under Virginia law, is an independent city, politically independent of any county.

Towns
 Middletown
 Stephens City

Census-designated places
 Lake Holiday
 Shawneeland

Other unincorporated communities

Notable people
William McGuire (judge) (1765-1820), lawyer, first chief justice of the Mississippi Territory

See also
 National Register of Historic Places listings in Frederick County, Virginia
 List of routes in Frederick County, Virginia

References

External links

 Official Website for the County of Frederick
 Frederick County Public Schools
 Winchester-Frederick County Chamber of Commerce
 Winchester Frederick County Convention and Visitor Bureau
 Winchester Frederick County Circuit Court Clerks

 
Virginia counties
Northern Virginia counties
Northwestern Turnpike
Winchester, VA–WV MSA
1743 establishments in the Thirteen Colonies